The Third Hand (第三隻手) is a 1981 Hong Kong adult film directed by Chu Mu.

Known as The Extra Hand as a tentative title, director Chu Mu says it cannot be explained in a few words and one has to see the film.

Plot 
The story begins with a bed in an apartment on which lies a corpse. The owner of the apartment sells the furniture to a furniture company, after which the bed is then sold to Ah Keung (Lam Pei-huang) and Ah Ping (Luk Kim-min) who discover there is a roll of money hidden inside, and this results in each thinking up ways of keeping the money.

However, later the wife of Ah Keung's boss (Lin Yang Yang) makes love to Ah Keung on the bed at the very time that another man Chiang Pui (To Lung) is attempting to gain entry into the house by way of a water pipe. After watching through the window at the antics on the bed, which he finds most entertaining, a hand emerges from beneath the bed, and Chiang Pui becomes so afraid that he falls from the water-pipe.

Cast 
 Wong Nap-si
 Wang Han-chen
 Lai Qui
 Sa Sa
 Mak Wa-mei
 Lam Yang Yang as Lady Boss
 Lau Fong-sai
 Yue Wing
 Luk Kim-min as Ah Ping
 Lam Pei-huang as Ah Keung
 To Lung as Chiang Pui

External links 

 

1981 films
1980s pornographic films
Hong Kong erotic films
1980s Hong Kong films